John IX may refer to:

 Pope John IX (died 900)
 John IX bar Shushan (died 1073), Syriac Orthodox Patriarch of Antioch
 John IX of Constantinople, Patriarch of Constantinople, 1111–1134
 John IX of Haugwitz, 1524–1595
 John IX, Count of Oldenburg, 1272–c. 1301
 John IX of Salm-Kyrburg-Mörchingen, 1575–1623

See also
 Johann IX. Philipp von Walderdorff